Druif Beach is a promontory on the island of Aruba, located on the west coast of the island. The beach is about 300 metres long.

References

Beaches of Aruba